Richard Findlay Tapper (born 14 May 1968 in Prince Albert, Saskatchewan) is a former New Zealand freestyle swimmer.

Born in Canada, Tapper was based out of Invercargill when he competed for New Zealand at the 1992 Summer Olympics in Barcelona, Spain. He won the bronze medal with the Men's 4x200 Freestyle Relay Team at the 1990 Commonwealth Games in Auckland.

Richard is a general and colorectal surgeon at Christchurch Public Hospital.

External links
 Profile on NZ Olympic Committee

1968 births
Living people
Canadian male freestyle swimmers
New Zealand people of Canadian descent
Olympic swimmers of New Zealand
Sportspeople from Prince Albert, Saskatchewan
Sportspeople from Saskatchewan
Swimmers at the 1992 Summer Olympics
New Zealand male freestyle swimmers
New Zealand colorectal surgeons
Commonwealth Games bronze medallists for New Zealand
Swimmers at the 1990 Commonwealth Games
Commonwealth Games medallists in swimming
Medallists at the 1990 Commonwealth Games